Karlievo is a village in western Bulgaria. It is located in the municipality of Zlatitsa, in Sofia Province. As of 2007 the village had 245 inhabitants.

Geography 

Karlievo is situated in a mountainous region in the Sredna Gora mountains. The nearest village is Chelopech at 2 km to the west. Most of the population is employed in the large copper and gold mines in the surrounding region or in Cumerio Med between Zlatitsa and Pirdop - the largest copper smelter and refinery in the Balkan peninsula.

Events

Gallery

Notes 

Villages in Sofia Province